So'oialo is a surname, and may refer to:

 James So'oialo (born 2 March 1989), Samoan rugby union footballer, brother of Rodney and Steven
 Rodney So'oialo (born 3 October 1979), New Zealand rugby union player, brother of James and Steven
 Steven So'oialo (born 11 May 1977), Samoan rugby union footballer, brother of James and Rodney